Jovesa Rokuta Vocea is a Fijian politician and member of the Parliament of Fiji. He is a member of the People's Alliance.

Vocea is a former civil servant. In April 2015 he was appointed as Commissioner for the Northern Division. He retired as Commissioner Northern in December 2019.

He was selected as a PA candidate in the 2022 Fijian general election, and was elected to Parliament, winning 2363 votes. On 24 December 2022 he was appointed Assistant Minister for i-Taukei Affairs in the coalition government of Sitiveni Rabuka.

References

Living people
Fijian civil servants
People's Alliance (Fiji) politicians
Members of the Parliament of Fiji
Year of birth missing (living people)